Emilie (Emmi) Florine Auguste Welter (née Merten; 7 August 1887 – 10 March 1971) was a German politician. She was a Member of the Bundestag from the Christian Democratic Union in the 1950s and 1960s.

References 

1887 births
1971 deaths
Members of the Bundestag 1953–1957
Members of the Bundestag 1957–1961
Members of the Bundestag 1961–1965
20th-century German politicians
20th-century German women politicians
Members of the Bundestag for the Christian Democratic Union of Germany
Members of the Bundestag for North Rhine-Westphalia

Female members of the Bundestag